Ruth Winifred Brown (July 26, 1891September 10, 1975) was an American librarian, best known for her dismissal from service for civil rights activities in the late 1940s. On July 25, 1950, she was dismissed after 30 years of service as the Bartlesville, Oklahoma public librarian. She was relieved of her duties in 1950 on the baseless accusation that she was a communist when, in fact, she was fired because of her desegregation activities. She was accused of providing "subversive" materials to the public and indoctrinating children against the principles of America. However, it was widely believed at the time that her dismissal was in response to her activities promoting the equality of African-Americans during a time when the leading citizens of the city were not ready to face equality for all.

Life
Brown was born in Hiawatha, Kansas on July 26, 1891 to Silas and Jennie Brown, two New England transplants. She lived with her parents and brother Merrit in Kansas until the family moved to California where Brown went to high school. She attended high school in California and then Northwestern State Normal School in Alva, Oklahoma. Graduating in 1910, Brown then attended the University of Oklahoma in Norman, Oklahoma, graduating in 1915. Brown also attended the School of Library Service of Columbia University during summers, where she worked with Helen E. Haines and Ernestine Rose, both of which were fierce supporters of intellectual freedom.} Brown taught in Eufaula and Nowata but chose not to continue in the profession. Instead she wanted to move back home to be closer to her parents, especially her mother who was confined to a wheelchair. Brown moved to the small town of Bartlesville in 1919, where her parents now lived. In November 1919, Brown accepted the job a librarian at the local Carnegie library in Bartlesville. She felt a calling to her work and said she would not marry because the library was "like a marriage to her". She was passionate about the children who visited the library, knew them all by name, and even persuaded some to become librarians. 

Active in the Oklahoma Library Association (OLA), Brown was elected secretary in 1920, treasurer in 1926, and president in 1931. During her presidential year, she gave a speech which advised librarians to "reduce to a minimum worry about lost books" and to encourage the many who did not "make use of their right to library service". She stated that libraries should provide "recreational culture suited to all needs" of the community they served which was a forward-thinking idea for libraries at that time. Like Ranganathan's first law, she believed books were for use and wanted "books worn out by use". Brown truly believed that the library should be both a repository for information and a source for wholesome recreation. 

Brown was a library advocate during the Depression and provided useful materials for the unemployed men in the community as well as their families. She also documented how her materials were used, sometimes in great detail. For example, in 1931, she reported that the library's collection of 25,062 volumes had been used 13.19 times by every person in her service area. She was also a fervent believer in the principle of "equity of access" with her commitment to racial equality in the use of the public library.

Activities leading to dismissal

Brown had long worked for equal rights for all citizens. As early as the 1920s, she was working to allow equal access to the library for African-Americans.

In 1946, after the observing how African-American soldiers fought in the army for rights they were denied at home, Brown helped established the Committee on the Practice of Democracy (COPD) in Bartlesville. The COPD worked to improve "relations among people of all races; more particularly, to foster improvement of conditions arising out of discrimination based on race, creed, or color". Later the same year, the Bartlesville chapter of COPD decided to affiliate with the Congress of Racial Equality (CORE) becoming the only chapter of CORE below the Mason–Dixon line. The group quickly went into action working to recruit an African-American doctor to live and work in the black community of Bartlesville. They, together with the YWCA, sponsored interracial conferences and seminars featuring black and white speakers.

In 1939, only 99 of the 774 Southern public libraries provided services for African American patrons. Though these libraries were under the doctrine of "separate but equal", African American libraries received inadequate reading materials, short hours, and minimal budgets. In the Bartlesville Public Library, Brown had been providing service to African Americans since the 1920s. Records show borrower's names in the registry and a small number are identified as "colored". By 1950, the library subscribed to Ebony and Negro Digest. Apparently, Brown was also interested in integrating the children's story time but was dissuaded from doing so by the library commission. She then turned her attention to an educational exhibit on "Negro Culture from Africa to Today". On a personal note, Brown was pushing the cultural norms and limits in many ways. She upset many in the community when she took two female, African-American teachers to a local diner in downtown Bartlesville. The diner refused to serve them and Brown and her companions staged what later became known (during the civil rights era) as a "sit-in". She took African-American friends with her to church and promoted a lecture by Bayard Rustin, an African-American Quaker pacifist. Almost immediately, the leaders of the community began to work to remove Brown.

The battle between the American Legion and librarian Ruth W. Brown over materials in the Bartlesville Public Library (BPL) revealed the racial tensions in 1950s Oklahoma and the use of McCarthyist tactics to counter the forces of integration.

A citizens' committee was formed to work towards her dismissal. Though it now seems apparent that the true reason behind the anger in the community was a backlash against integration, at the time even the city leaders and commission realized that Brown could not be fired because of her political views and her civil rights activities as they all took place in her own time. Instead, the citizen's group against Brown attacked her for having supposedly subversive materials in the library. The library board was asked by the city commission to perform a complete examination of the library's collection and the general operations and work ethic of Brown. After a thorough examination, the library board reported that they could not find any evidence of subversive materials or subversive teachings.

On March 9, 1950, the Bartlesville paper, the Examiner-Enterprise, published a picture of the materials in question. The picture showed a pile of copies of The Nation and The New Republic (magazines that were now being questioned but which had been subscribed to by the library for years) with two books on top. The first book was The Russians: The Land, the People and Why They Fight and the other was pictured without its dust jacket or any library markings. There was never any acknowledgement or admission by the paper of where this picture was taken. It had not been authorized by the library board and the books on top could never again be located. The library board, the American Library Association's Intellectual Freedom Committee and Brown were locked in a battle with the Bartlesville city leaders. Miss Brown is nationally recognized as the first librarian to receive assistance from the Intellectual Freedom Committee of the American Library Association.

On July 10, the city commission thanked the library board for its service and summarily dismissed them all. A new board was immediately appointed which supported the city's position regarding Brown. The campaign to fire her was almost complete and though "everyone knows what they are really fighting" as Brown later commented to a friend, her opponents chose the McCarthy era scare tactics as a more viable way to rid the city of her progressive views on racial equality. Brown was interviewed by the city commission on July 25, 1950. She refused to answer questions about her private life except in writing at her attorney's request. When asked about having the subversive materials (New Republic, The Nation, Soviet Russia Today) in the library she responded that they were three of seventy-five publications to which she subscribed. Further, she continued, she did not feel she should censor what her public chose to read and that she had subscribed to them for 15 or 20 years. However, in spite of no clear evidence of subversion, she was fired the same day.

Allegations of subversive Communist activity centered on threatening the "American way of life", as it was put by one of her antagonists, the postmaster and library board chairman E. R. Christopher. Bartlesville's elite resorted to censorship and suppression to silence the proponents of racial justice and equality and rid the library of supposedly subversive material. McCarthyism was an effective means to ensure the preservation of Bartlesville's conservative power structure.

Though the Bartlesville commission's public position was that Brown was fired for insubordination, to the outside, it appeared she had been fired for trying to protect the library's position of intellectual freedom and the right to free speech. A group of supporters, calling themselves the Friends of Miss Brown, tried to pursue her cause in court but were unsuccessful due to a lack of constitutional standing. Though she was unsuccessful, her friends managed to keep her case in the public eye for quite some time. The Oklahoma Library Association as well as the ALA and the ACLU all protested the attack on intellectual freedom and Bartlesville continued to be scrutinized on a national level. This attention surprised and embarrassed the town which wished to go back to the way things were and end the spotlight on Bartlesville.

On March 11, 2007, a bronze bust of Brown was unveiled at the Bartlesville Library and a library scholarship fund was established in her honor.

Personal life
Although Brown never married, she did attempt to adopt two sisters who were orphaned. The welfare agency was unwilling to place them with Brown who was unmarried. The elder, Mildred "Holly" Holiday, ran away from her abusive foster parents when she was eighteen and went back to live with Brown. Holly's sister Ellen then ran away to live with Brown who was finally able to adopt the younger girl. 

After her retirement, Brown moved to Cincinnati, Ohio, staying in an adjacent apartment near Holly's residence. Due to failing health, Brown moved in with Ellen's family in Collinsville, Oklahoma. On September 10, 1975, Brown died at the age of 84 from complications of a stroke. At her request, her body was donated to the University of Oklahoma Medical Center.

Popular culture
The events in Columbia Pictures' 1956 film Storm Center were largely fictional, but the character played by Bette Davis was based on Ruth Brown and her struggle with the county commission over communist literature.

References

Further reading

External links
Bartlesville Public Library

1891 births
1975 deaths
20th-century American women
Activists for African-American civil rights
American librarians
American women librarians
American librarianship and human rights
People from Hiawatha, Kansas
People from Alva, Oklahoma
People from Bartlesville, Oklahoma
University of Oklahoma alumni